The first complete Catalan Bible translation was produced by the Catholic Church, between 1287 and 1290. It was entrusted to Jaume de Montjuich by Alfonso II of Aragon. Remains of this version can be found in Paris (Bibliothèque Nationale).

In the early fifteenth century, the Bible was translated into Catalan again by Bonifaci Ferrer. Ferrer's translation, known as  the Valencian Bible, was printed in 1478 before any Bible was printed in English or Spanish.
 The prohibition, in Spain and other Catholic countries, of vernacular translations, along with the decline of the Catalan language until its renaissance in the nineteenth century, explains why there were no translations into Catalan from the sixteenth to the nineteenth century.

In 1832 a Catalan exile in London, Josep Melcior Prat i Colom, sponsored by the British and Foreign Bible Society, translated the New Testament, which was published afterwards in 1836 in Barcelona and again in 1888 in Madrid as the (Lo Nou Testament de nostre Senyor Jesu-Christ).

List of Bible translators

Josep Melcior Prat i Colom (1779-1855)
Joan Roís de Corella, 15th century psalter
Bonifaci Ferrer (Valencia 1350-1417), 1478
Jaume de Montjuich, 13th century
Pau and Samuel Sais, 2000

20th century to present
In the twentieth century many new translations emerged, both Catholic and Protestant.

Catholic translations
1915-1925   Unfinished translation by Frederic Clascar (Barcelona: Institut d'Estudis Catalans): only Genesis (1915), Song of Songs (1918) and Exodus (1925)
1928-1929  El Nou Testament (Barcelona: Foment de Pietat Catalana)
1928-1948 La Sagrada Bíblia, by Fundació Bíblica Catalana (Barcelona: Alpha); started in 1927 (published in 15 individual volumes, also known as "Bíblia de Cambó", as it was funded by Francesc Cambó). There are several translators, among them: Carles Riba, Carles Cardó or Josep Maria Millàs i Vallicrosa.
1926-1987 La Bíblia: versió dels textos originals i notes pels Monjos de Montserrat: by the Monks of Montserrat, in 28 volumes. Other editions based on it have been published, in one volume and with some textual variations
1968 La Sagrada Bíblia, 2nd Edition: a new translation in one volume, reprinted some times by Fundació Bíblica Catalana. It is a different translation from the 1928-1948 version from the same publisher.
1980 Nou Testament (Barcelona: Claret), by Jaume Sidera i Plana

Protestant translations
1988 Nou Testament: the New Testament, by the Institució Bíblica Evangèlica de Catalunya, with the help of the International Bible Society
2000 La Bíblia: la Sagrada Escriptura en llengua catalana; also La Bíblia del 2000or Bíblia Evangèlica Catalana (BEC), translated by Pau Sais and Samuel Sais ([Barcelona]: Institució Bíblica Evangèlica de Catalunya), with some editions
2009 La Santa bíblia o les Santes Escriptures (London: Trinitarian Bible Society), from the Massoretic text

Ecumenical translation
For the Ecumenical translation, Catholic and Protestant translators worked together. However, two separate translations of the Bible still emerged- the Catholic edition included deuterocanonical texts, while the Protestant edition did not.

1993 Bíblia Catalana Interconfessional (BCI), by Associació Bíblica de Catalunya, Editorial Claret, and Societats Bíbliques Unides, with some reprints.
2004 Evangelis: de Marc, Mateu, Lluc i Joan, amb els fets dels Apòstols, la Carta de Pau als romans i el LLibre de L'Apocalipsi (Barcelona: Proa), translated by Joan F. Mira in a literary and philological way, religiously neutral.

Jehovah's Witnesses
2016 Traducció del Nou Món de les Escriptures Gregues Cristianes (Selters, Germany).

Comparison

References

External links
 La Biblia del 2000
 La Bíblia a Internet

Catalan
Catalan-language literature
Catalan-language works